Fossil Fuel: The XTC Singles 1977–92 is a U.K. compilation album by XTC released in 1996.  It was their third such Greatest Hits album following 1982's Waxworks: Some Singles 1977-1982 and 1985's The Compact XTC. It collects all 31 of their Virgin Records UK singles in chronological order. It does not include their pseudonymous singles as The Dukes of Stratosphear, The Three Wise Men or The Colonel.

The two discs reflect their shift in popularity from Great Britain to the United States in the mid-1980s.  Some of Disc 1's tracks ("Making Plans for Nigel", "Sgt. Rock (Is Going to Help Me)", "Senses Working Overtime") were Top 40 hits in their homeland while a handful of songs from Disc 2 became popular on stateside college radio ("Dear God", "The Mayor of Simpleton", "The Ballad of Peter Pumpkinhead").

The compilation closes out with "Wrapped in Grey", which had been released as the third single from 1992's Nonsuch and then quickly recalled and deleted by Virgin Records, an event which effectively ended XTC's association with the label.

It reached No. 33 on the UK album charts.

Track listing

UK CD: CDVDX 2811
All songs written by Andy Partridge, except where noted.

Disc 1
"Science Friction" – 3:14
"Statue of Liberty" – 2:52
"This is Pop?" – 2:40
"Are You Receiving Me?" – 3:04
"Life Begins at the Hop" (Colin Moulding) – 3:47
"Making Plans for Nigel" (Moulding) – 4:12
"Ten Feet Tall" (Moulding) – 3:13
"Wait Till Your Boat Goes Down" – 4:20
"Generals and Majors" (Moulding) – 3:41
"Towers of London" – 4:38
"Sgt. Rock (Is Going to Help Me)" – 3:36
"Love at First Sight" (Moulding) – 3:07
"Respectable Street" – 3:07
"Senses Working Overtime" – 4:34
"Ball and Chain" (Moulding) – 4:29
"No Thugs in Our House" – 5:10

Disc 2
"Great Fire" – 3:50
"Wonderland" (Moulding) – 4:15
"Love on a Farmboy's Wages" – 3:59
"All You Pretty Girls" – 3:59
"This World Over" – 4:45
"Wake Up" (Moulding) – 3:40
"Grass" (Moulding) – 2:42
"The Meeting Place" (Moulding) – 3:13
"Dear God" – 3:37
"Mayor of Simpleton" – 3:57
"King for a Day" (Moulding) – 3:36
"The Loving" – 3:54
"The Disappointed" – 3:38
"The Ballad of Peter Pumpkinhead" – 5:03
"Wrapped in Grey" – 3:46

XTC compilation albums
1996 compilation albums
Virgin Records compilation albums
1996 greatest hits albums